Qaleh-ye Khan (also Romanized as Qal‘eh-ye Khān and Qal‘eh Khān) is a village in Pishkuh Rural District, in the Central District of Taft County, Yazd Province, Iran. At the 2006 census, its population was 13, in 7 families.

References 

Populated places in Taft County